Whitewater Baldy is the highest point of the Mogollon Mountains and the 3rd highest mountain in Southern New Mexico, after Sierra Blanca Peak and Lincoln County's Lookout Mountain. It is located in Catron County in the Gila Wilderness, part of the Gila National Forest.

Like all of the surrounding mountains, Whitewater Baldy is part of the Mogollon-Datil volcanic field, and consists of volcanic materials formed between forty and twenty-five million years ago. It is drained on the west side by Whitewater Creek, and on the east by Iron Creek.

Despite its name, Whitewater Baldy is forested up to its summit. It can be accessed by trail from the west along the Crest Trail (Forest Trail 182). It can also be accessed from the east side of the Gila Wilderness.

The area was severely impacted by the Whitewater-Baldy Complex Fire in 2012.

References

Mountains of New Mexico
Landforms of Catron County, New Mexico
Mountains of Catron County, New Mexico